Mehlville High School is a public comprehensive high school in Mehlville, Missouri, United States. It is part of the Mehlville R-9 School District.

History 

The school and surrounding community is named after Charles Mehl, a German-born contractor, whose family moved into a rural area a few miles south of St. Louis. He was given a land-grant in 1846 to acknowledge his service in the Mexican-American War.

Mehlville High School was first established in 1925 after parents demanded local secondary education for their children. Previously, teens in the Mehlville-Oakville area had to commute to Hancock or Kirkwood. The school was first housed at the old St. John's School on Will Avenue, across the street from the school's current site. Mehlville's first graduating class (Class of 1930) consisted of just two students. In 1939, the school moved across the street to a small two-story building at 3100 Lemay Ferry Road. It was rumored that the building was constructed on the site of an old gypsy camp. To handle the rapidly growing student body, the current building was built adjacent to the previous one in 1955. 

Both of the old school buildings still stand. St. John's School sat dormant for many years, but it was eventually renovated and reopened as MOSAIC in 2017. The second building (now known as the Witzel Learning Center) served as a junior high school from 1955 until 1974, when Margaret Buerkle Middle School was built. After that, it housed the district's Early Childhood program. It is currently home to SCOPE, an alternative education program, and some district offices, including the IT department. The building is set to be demolished in the near future, with SCOPE and the district offices being moved elsewhere off-campus. What will replace the Witzel Learning Center currently remains unknown.

The school's original colors were maroon and gold, but they were changed in 1940 because the old color scheme looked similar to Affton High School's colors and there was concern "it would cause confusion on the court and field" Today's colors are green and white, often accented with black or grey.  

Since the current school building was constructed, it has been renovated on numerous occasions, starting with the renovation of 1957, when the school built on a gymnasium and cafeteria. A couple years later, in 1962, a second gymnasium and home economics rooms were added (Gymnasiums at the time were sex segregated; the Boy's Gymnasium was the older gym and the Girl's Gymnasium was the newer gym). In 1970 the school built a new library and drama center. 

The renovation in 1993 added the commons area, with a new entrance to the main gymnasium (Gym A), as well 12 science classroom labs. The front of the school was rebuilt in the early 2000s, and the William Nottelman auditorium, built adjacent to the school, was opened in 2013. 

Throughout the 2022-23 school year, the district will use the money from bond measure Proposition S to renovate the school further, including security renovations to the school's main entrance, building on new classrooms, renovating the school's football/soccer stadium, the construction of a new baseball field, and demolishing/rebuilding parts of the school that are aging and/or deteriorating.

One of the school's most notable achievements was their 1999 Class 5A State Championship in football. The team had an 13-1 overall record. This is the school's only state championship in football, but the team has reached the big game two other times in 1994 and 2007.

Mehlville's mascot, an anthropomorphic black panther, is commonly seen at sporting events greeting students and cheering on the team along with the Green Pit, Mehlville's student section known for it's loud and rowdy antics. In March 2022, the mascot finally got a name: Mehlvin the Panther. It was decided by a student poll run by the Mehlville Student Leadership group, and the previously mentioned name was the most popular and well-received by the student body.

Student Body 
Mehlville has a co-educational student body of 1,409 in the 2022-23 school year, declining by about 18% over the past five school years. Most students originate from Margaret Buerkle Middle School in Mehlville, with a majority of the remaining students coming from Washington Middle School in Concord. A handful of students are alumni of Bernard Middle School in North Oakville as well. The racial makeup of the school is approximately 77% White, 10% Black, 5% Asian, and 5% Hispanic. 

A large percentage of the student body is of Bosnian descent (the Greater St. Louis area is home to the largest Bosnian population outside of Europe.)

Athletics/Activities
For the 2013–2014 school year, the school offered 26 activities approved by the Missouri State High School Activities Association (MSHSAA): baseball, boys' and girls' basketball, sideline cheerleading, boys' and girls' cross country, dance team, 11-man football, boys' and girls' golf, Marching Band, Pep Band, scholar bowl, boys' and girls' soccer, softball, speech and debate, boys' and girls' swimming and diving, boys' and girls' tennis, boys' and girls' track and field, boys' and girls' volleyball, water polo, and wrestling.

School-sponsored activities include Art Club, Book Club, Broadcast Journalism, Culture Club, DECA (marketing), Drama Club, FBLA (Future Business Leaders of America), FCCLA, French Club, German Club, International Thespian Society, Mehlville Majorettes, National Honor Society, Spanish Club, STEP, Student Council, Student Prints, Teenage Health Consultant Program, The Reflector yearbook, and Color Guard (part of the Marching Band).

Mehlville students have won six state championships:
Football: 1999
Men's volleyball: 1988
Women's soccer: 1982
Wrestling: 1964
Men's water polo: 1979, 1980

The school has also produced one girls' swimming and diving individual state champion, two boys' track and field individual state champions, and one boys' track and field relay state champion.

Notable alumni

Keon Raymond, former CFL player for the Calgary Stampeders
Rick tha Rular, comedy hip hop artist
Mike Trapasso, pitching coach for UT Arlington Mavericks baseball
Melvin Williams, former NFL player
Dave Loos, retired college basketball coach, most successful coach in Ohio Valley Conference history

References

External links
 

High schools in St. Louis County, Missouri
Public high schools in Missouri
1930 establishments in Missouri
Buildings and structures in St. Louis County, Missouri